The 1927 UCLA Grizzlies football team was an American football team that represented the University of California, Los Angeles (UCLA) during the 1927 college football season.  The program, which was later known as the Bruins, was in their third year under head coach William H. Spaulding. The Grizzlies compiled a 6–2–1 record and outscored their opponents by a combined total of 144 to 54.

Schedule

References

UCLA
UCLA Bruins football seasons
UCLA Grizzlies football